Edward Amos Seymour (August 1, 1887 – July 4, 1965) was a member of the Wisconsin State Assembly.

Biography
Seymour was born Edward Amos Seymour on August 1, 1887 in De Pere, Wisconsin. In 1919, he married Laura Caroline Knuth. He died on July 4, 1965.

Career
Seymour served as Mayor of De Pere from 1950 to 1954 before serving in the Assembly from 1955 to 1958. He was a Republican.

References

People from De Pere, Wisconsin
Mayors of places in Wisconsin
Republican Party members of the Wisconsin State Assembly
1887 births
1965 deaths
20th-century American politicians